Streptomyces indicus is a bacterium species from the genus of Streptomyces which has been isolated from deep sea sediments from the Indian Ocean in India.

See also 
 List of Streptomyces species

References

Further reading

External links
Type strain of Streptomyces indicus at BacDive -  the Bacterial Diversity Metadatabase	

indicus
Bacteria described in 2011